was a Japanese zoologist, who published in mammalogy and  arachnology. He described several spider genera or species including :
 Heptathela
 Heptathela kimurai (Kimura-gumo)
 Pireneitega

References

External links

 Journal of Arachnology 33(2):501-508. 2005

Arachnologists
Japanese mammalogists
1888 births
1968 deaths
20th-century Japanese zoologists
People from Maizuru